The Birmingham and Midland Sheet Metal Workers' Society (BMSMWS) was a trade union representing sheet metal workers in the English Midlands.

The union's origins lay in the Birmingham Tin Plate Workers' Society, which was formed in 1859.  In 1876, it merged with the Wolverhampton Tin Plate Workers' Society to form what later became the National Amalgamated Association of Tin Plate Workers.  The societies retained much of their independence, particularly in the early years.  In 1906, the society renamed itself as the Birmingham Operative Tin-Plate, Sheet Metal	Workers and Braziers' Society.

In 1909, the Birmingham society fell into dispute with the National Amalgamated Association over payments to workers involved in disputes.  As a result, it left, forming the independent Birmingham and Midland Sheet Metal Workers' Society.  This remained independent when all the other sheet metal workers' unions merged into the National Union of Sheet Metal Workers and Braziers, until it finally joined the National Union of Sheet Metal Workers, Coppersmiths, Heating and Domestic Engineers in 1973.

Secretaries
1909: John Valentine Stevens
1920: Charles Brett
1939: Richard Baston
1951: Harry Townsend
1959: Alf Cooper

References

Trade unions established in 1876
Trade unions disestablished in 1973
1909 establishments in England
1973 disestablishments in England
Organisations based in Birmingham, West Midlands
Sheet metal workers' trade unions
Trade unions based in the West Midlands (county)
1859 establishments in England